Gustavo Brito (born 22 May 1954) is a Puerto Rican judoka. He competed in the men's half-middleweight event at the 1972 Summer Olympics.

References

1954 births
Living people
Puerto Rican male judoka
Olympic judoka of Puerto Rico
Judoka at the 1972 Summer Olympics
Place of birth missing (living people)